E. robusta  may refer to:
 Eonycteris robusta, the Philippine dawn bat, a bat species found in the Philippines
 Eucalyptus robusta, the swamp mahogany, swamp messmate or swamp stringybark, a tree species native to eastern Australia
 Euodia robusta, a plant species found in Malaysia and Singapore
 Euparkerella robusta, a frog species endemic to Brazil
 Eurycea robusta, the Blanco blind salamander, an aquatic, lungless salamander species native to the United States

See also
 Robusta (disambiguation)